The Pride of Performance is a civil award presented annually on independence day (14 August) by the president to the Pakistani citizens and foreign people in recognition of their contribution to the art, sports, literature, science and education. It also seeks to recognize the "meritorious contribution" to the national interest of Pakistan. It is the highest literary award bestowed by Pakistan.

2020
In 2020, the government of Pakistan presented forty-three Pride of Performance awards to the people working in different fields as described by its eligibility criteria.

See also 
 Pride of Performance Awards (2010–2019)

References 

Civil awards and decorations of Pakistan